Philip Leo Sullivan (October 2, 1889 – June 12, 1960) was a United States district judge of the United States District Court for the Northern District of Illinois.

Education and career

Born in Marengo, Illinois, on October 2, 1889, Sullivan received a Bachelor of Laws from Loyola University Chicago School of Law in 1911. He was in private practice in Chicago, Illinois from 1911 to 1916. He was a master in chancery for the Superior Court of Cook County from 1916 to 1917 and again from 1919 to 1921. In the interim 1917 to 1919, Sullivan served as a field artillery lieutenant in the United States Army during World War I. He was elected a Judge of the Circuit Court of Cook County and served from 1921 until his appointment to the federal bench in 1933.

Federal judicial service
Sullivan received a recess appointment from President Franklin D. Roosevelt on November 8, 1933, to a seat on the United States District Court for the Northern District of Illinois vacated by Judge George E. Q. Johnson. He was nominated to the same position by President Roosevelt on January 8, 1934. He was confirmed by the United States Senate on February 20, 1934, and received his commission on March 1, 1934. He served as Chief Judge from 1957 to 1959. His service terminated on June 12, 1960, due to his death.

References

Sources
 

1889 births
1960 deaths
Illinois state court judges
Judges of the United States District Court for the Northern District of Illinois
United States district court judges appointed by Franklin D. Roosevelt
20th-century American judges
United States Army officers
Loyola University Chicago School of Law alumni